Ninja is the first studio album of Christina Aguilar - a popular Thai artist. It was only the second album by a Thai artist to sell over 1,000,000 copies (the first was by Thongchai McIntyre) and the first album by a  Thai female artist to sell 1,000,000 copies. In total, Ninja has sold over 1,900,000 copies in Thailand.

Singles that are still well known are "Ninja", "Prawat Sad (History)", "Plik Lock (Upside Down)", "Plao Rok Na (It isn't)" and "Hau Jai Khor Ma (Request From My Heart)".

Track listing
 Plik Lock (Upside Down)
 Rohn (Hot)
 Ninja
 Plao Rok Na (It isn't)
 Khun Worapon (Mr. Worapon)
 Ya Pai Sie Nam Ta (Don't wanna Cry)
 Khor Kheun (Return It Back)
 Prawat Sad (History)
 Hua Jai Khor Ma (Request From My Heart)
 Reuang Kao Lao Mai (Same Story)
 Kham Tham Thee Tong Tob (Answer Needed Question)

Christina Aguilar albums
1990 albums
Thai-language albums